The Military Industry Corporation is the state-run defense corporation of Sudan. It is responsible for the production of a wide range of defence equipment, such as munitions, firearms, artillery etc.

History
The MIC was established by national decree in 1993 under the Ministry of Defence and consolidate the existing defense establishment and manufacturing plants.

Organisation
The MIC is grouped into the following major complexes covering different areas:

 Alshagara Industrial Complex (AIC)
Established in 1959 as the El Sharja Ammunition Plant, it was absorbed into MIC during its formation. AIC is responsible for manufacturing a wide range of small arms ammunition.

 Yarmouk Industrial Complex (YIC)
Established in 1994 and inaugurated in 1996, YIC appears to be responsible for the processing and manufacturing of dual use products that cover the construction, transport and manufacturing industries in Khartoum's Soba section. It's managed by the National Intelligence and Security Service and has a 35% ownership by Iran. Iranian Revolutionary Guard Corp personnel were reported to be working there. In 2012, it was suggested that the Israeli Air Force conducted an air strike on YIC.

 Elshaheed Ibrahim Shamseldeen Complex for Heavy Industries
Established in 2002 in Giad, the complex is responsible for the manufacturing and maintenance of armored vehicles as well as industrial heavy vehicles.

 Alzargaa Engineering Complex
Established in 1999 and inaugurated in 2004 in Halfya, Khartoum, the Alzargaa Engineering Complex is responsible for various electronics and electro-optic equipment for the Sudan military. It is also involved in the Sudanese telecommunications market through Sudatel.

 Safat Aviation Complex (SAC)
Established in 2005, SAC is responsible for supporting the Sudanese Air Force in the maintenance of its military aviation capabilities. Africa Confidential reports that UAVs made in SAC were done with Iranian assistance.

Productions
The MIC have advertised a wide range of products that appears to be versions of equipment originally supplied to Sudan or licensed by China, Russia and Iran. Armored vehicles are repaired and produced at the Elshaheed Ibrahim Shams el Deen Complex in Khartoum.

Small arms

Pistols
 Marra
 A CZ-75 clone built with Chinese machinery, originally designed and built in the Czech Republic.

 Lado (CZ-75 Compact)
 A clone built from Chinese machinery; in .32 ACP caliber, originally designed and built in Czech Republic.

Assault rifles
 Dinar G3
 Local licensed copy of the G3 rifle designed in Germany, it is assembled with Iranian machine tools.

 Maz (MAZ)
 Chinese AKM. Built with Chinese machinery. It is marketed as a submachine gun.

 Terab
 Chinese AR-15 clone, built with machinery bought from China. It was marked as being chambered in 7.62 NATO ammo. The correction was made that MIC documentation mentions that it chambers 5.56 NATO ammo in recent years.

 Sinan
 Based on the QBZ-97/Type 97, it is chambered in 5.56 NATO ammo and seemingly made from Chinese components shipped to Khartoum.

Sub-machine guns
 Tihraga
 Designed in Germany, it's made  from Iranian machinery.

Machine-guns
 Mokhtar
 A Type 80 machine gun built from machinery bought in China.

 Khawad
 A Type 85 heavy machine gun built from machinery bought in China.

 Karar
 A MG3 machine gun designed in Germany, also built from machinery bought in Iran.

Grenade launcher
 Ahmad/Abba
 A grenade launcher based on the QLZ-87 as Abba or Ahmad.

Light antitank weapons
 Sinar
A widely used antitank weapon, manufactured under from Bulgaria's ATGL-type RPGs, although the pistol grips were based on Iranian-made RPGs. A variant of it, the Sinar RPG-7V, is based on Iranian commando-type RPGs.

Heavy antitank weapons
 Sarib
 A licensed version of the HJ-8.

MANPADS
 Nayzak
 Made from the FN-6.

Armoured vehicles

Jeeps
 Karaba VTG01
 Licensed version of the Safir.

MBT
 Digna MBT
 Unlicensed copy from Russia/China.

 Al Basheer MBT (Type 85M-II)
 Unlicensed copy from China.

 Al Zubair 1 MBT
 Unlicensed copy from Iran.

 Al Zubair 2 MBT
 Unlicensed copy from China, similar to Type 59D.

 SarSar-1
 SarSar-2
 An armoured reconnaissance vehicle based on a South Korean KIA truck chassis made under licence.

 Tamal
 A technical based on the Ruiqi pickup trucks made under Zhengzhou Nissan.

 Nimr LRPV:
 An armoured patrol vehicle based on a Dongfeng-made vehicle.

Howitzer
 Abu Fatma SPG
 Unlicensed copy from Bulgaria or Iran.

IFV
 Shareef 1 IFV
 Unlicensed copy, originally produced in Russia; derived from the BTR-80A IFV.

 Shareef 2 IFV
 Unlicensed copy, originally produced in China; derived from the WZ551 IFV.

 Shareef 3 IFV
 An upgrade to the BTR-70 by changing original two ZMZ-4905 engines with a more fuel-efficient KAMAZ-7403 V8 water-cooled diesel developing 260hp at 2,600 rpm with the installation of a BMP-1 IFV turret.

 Amir IFV
 Unlicensed copy, originally produced in Iran; derived from the Rakhsh IFV.

 Amir 2 IFV
 Clone of the BRDM-2. Its engine is changed from a GAZ-41 V8 petrol engine developing 140 hp to an Isuzu 6HH-1 6-cylinder diesel developing 210 hp.

 Khatim 1 IFV
 Unlicensed copy, originally produced in Iran, derived from the Boragh IFV.

 Khatim 2
 Variant of Khatim 1, houses a mortar.

 Khatim 4
 Variant of Khatim 1. It debuted at the IDEX 2017 convention.

Artillery
 Nijoumi
 Unlicensed copy, originally produced in Russia; derived from the BS-3.

 Khalifa
 Unlicensed copy, originally produced in Russia; derived from the D-30M. It's mounted on a Kamaz truck.

 Mahdi
 Unlicensed copy, originally produced in Russia; derived from the M-30.

 Aboud
 Unlicensed copy, originally produced in Russia; derived from the M-37M.

 Saba
 Unlicensed copy, originally produced in Russia; derived from the SPG-9.

 Taka
 Unlicensed copy, originally produced in China; derived from the Chinese MLRS Type 63. It's mounted on a South Korean KIA-made truck.

Others
 Ateed
 An indigenous RCWS system, it debuted at the IDEX 2015 convention. It's licensed from the Iranian ARIO-H762 RCWS made by Rayan Roshd Afzar.

References

External links
 Official Website

Military of Sudan
Companies based in Khartoum